Karanje is a village in the Karmala taluka of Solapur district in Maharashtra state, India.

Demographics
Covering  and comprising 420 households at the time of the 2011 census of India, Karanje had a population of 1799. There were 958 males and 841 females, with 184 people being aged six or younger.

References

Villages in Karmala taluka